Karol Bučko is a Slovak former football manager.

He coached Sokol NV Bratislava, Slávia Bratislava, TTS Trenčín, FC Nitra, Inter Bratislava, Banik Ostrava and VSS Košice.

References

Czechoslovak football managers
Slovak football managers
ŠK Slovan Bratislava managers
SK Brann managers
FC Baník Ostrava managers
FC VSS Košice managers
Possibly living people
Year of birth missing
FC Nitra managers
Czechoslovak expatriate sportspeople in Norway